Louis Isidore Lavater (2 March 1867 – 22 May 1953) was an Australian composer and author born in Victoria, of Swedish extraction.
He published more than a hundred musical works. He prepared musical settings of popular folklore by collaborating with well known Australian lyricists of his time, including Banjo Paterson, Henry Lawson and Mary Gilmore. He was a leading proponent of the Australian bush ballad as a vehicle for music education. In 1938, Alfred Hill composed a musical setting of Lavater's verse Mopoke. Lavater's words were also set by Australian composers Doctor Ruby Davy and Fanny Turbayne.

Notoriety

Lavater was regarded as a gifted leader of music in rural Victoria. He was fondly known for his direction of Liedertafel concerts held between 1890 and 1920.

In 1927 Gertrude Hart and Bernard Cronin founded the Society of Australian Authors. Cronin was president and Lavater and Hart were vice-presidents. Its aim was to raise the profile of Australian authors across Australia and also to welcome visiting writers. Cronin thought that the society became too political and it ceased to operate in 1936.

An oil portrait of Louis Lavater by Rollo Thomson hangs in the State Library of Victoria. Lavater composed ballet orchestrations which played abroad and arranged light opera.
His piano miniatures have been recorded by Larry Sitsky The White Owl was revived in a 1961 recording by Jessica Dix and Arnold Matters.

Performances
Lavater's setting of The Old Bark Hut by Banjo Paterson was revived for a production of bush ballad musical Under the Coolibah Tree produced by the Waterside Worker's Union in 1956.

Musical works
 1880 Queen Mab Waltz
 1891 Nina (Ballet)
 1895 Australis (Australian Hymn words added by Gallipoli correspondent John Sandes)
 1921 Demon Wind (appeared in a 1921 musical play Laughing Murra by Euphemia Coulson Davidson Nee Kidd)
 1922 Dance of the Saplings
 1924 Awakening – Sonata in A major
 1928 Canon in E flat
 1932 Valse Lente 
 1933 Meadow Clover (two part song based on his 1928 Canon)
 1923 Hornpipe in G
 1924 Valse capricieuse
 1936 Aubade
 1936 By starlight – serenade for string and piano
 1936 A summer night – SATB voices
 1937 We Beseech Thee Almighty God
 1937 Twelve Preludes for Piano
 1937 Trav'lin' down the Castlereagh (words by Banjo Paterson)
 1937 The Old Bark Hut (words by Banjo Paterson)

Books
 1917 A Lover's Ephemeris
 1922 This Green Mortality

References

External links
 

1867 births
1953 deaths
Australian male composers
Australian composers
20th-century Australian poets
Australian male poets
20th-century Australian male writers
Australian songwriters
People educated at Wesley College (Victoria)